The Five Temple Caves is a series of rock cut Buddhist caves in Subei Mongol Autonomous County, Gansu, northwest China. The complex once numbered twenty-two caves but over the centuries the number was reduced to five, of which four remain today, in a gorge on the left bank of the Danghe River (党河). On the basis of their structure and iconography, one of the caves is dated to the Northern Wei, the other three to the Five Dynasties and Song. In 2013, in recognition of their significance to China , the Five Temple Caves were designated by SACH a Major Historical and Cultural Site Protected at the National Level.

Caves
There are four caves with murals:

One Temple Cave
A further five kilometres to the south, on the east bank of the Danghe, is a site known as the One Temple Cave. One cave with murals survives, showing donor figures and dated to the tenth century.

See also
 Major National Historical and Cultural Sites (Gansu)
 Principles for the Conservation of Heritage Sites in China
 Tiantishan Caves

References

External links
  Five Temple Caves (Dunhuang Academy)

Buddhist grottoes in Gansu
Jiuquan
Northern Wei
Northern Zhou